The last name Lenstra may refer to:

 Abe Lenstra, former Dutch football player.
 Arjen Klaas Lenstra, Dutch mathematician.
 Hendrik Willem Lenstra, Jr., Dutch mathematician.
 Jan Karel Lenstra, Dutch mathematician.